Harry Kure (12 April 1928 – 8 September 2007) was a Norwegian footballer. He played in 16 matches for the Norway national football team from 1951 to 1957.

References

1928 births
2007 deaths
Norwegian footballers
Norway international footballers
Place of birth missing
Association footballers not categorized by position